AmSan, officially American Sanitary Incorporated, was a janitorial and cleaning products distributor in the United States. It was the largest national distributor that focused on providing janitorial products with revenues over $300 million. It was merged with four brands of Interline Brands forming a new brand called SupplyWorks.

History

In the 1990s AmSan became a conglomerate by buying 44 independent janitor and sanitary distributors. Some of AmSan's acquisitions are AmSan Eve, AmSan Vonachen-Elton, AmSan Nogg Chemical & Paper, and AmSan West. In 2002 Michael Mulhern became CEO of AmSan. Mulhern moved the headquarters of AmSan from Raleigh, North Carolina to Chicago, Illinois. Under Mulhern AmSan underwent a series of reforms dedicated to increasing profitability. AmSan turned over 40% of its top 35 executives, downsized its office operations and downsized under-performing distribution centers. AmSan created its own line of products with Renown. Renown represented 20% of AmSan's total revenue. By 2005 AmSan had revenues totalling $300 million. American Capital invested $25 million in the recapitalization of AmSan in 2005. Interline Brands acquired AmSan in May 2006 for $127.5 million. AmSan West, which has operations in Sacramento and Los Angeles, was not acquired by Interline Brands. In 2008 AmSan established a sales and distribution territory in Columbus, Cleveland, Pittsburgh, Atlanta and Nashville. In 2009 a showroom and walk-in store was established in Fort Myers, Florida. In December 2013 AmSan established a partnership with a non-profit organization Didlake that provides opportunities for those with disabilities to work on Renown products.

Products
AmSan supplies over 40,000 products to over 50,000 customers. Products of AmSan consists of national brands such as 3M, GOJO, Spartan, Rubbermaid and Georgia-Pacific. Products of AmSan could be purchased through its website or catalog.

Renown
AmSan's exclusive brand is Renown that makes up 20% of the total revenue and is distributed through Interline Brands. Renown comes in a variety of products such as latex gloves, paper towels and cleaning chemicals.

References

Business services companies established in 1987